The Lahore School of Economics (LSE), also known as "The Lahore School", is a private research university based in Lahore, Punjab, Pakistan and recognized by the Higher Education Commission of Pakistan. It was established in 1993 and chartered by the Government of the Punjab four years later in 1997 through the Lahore School of Economics Act. 

The Lahore School is small by population, having around 200 full-time faculty members, 2700 students across undergraduate programs and 400 across graduate and post-graduate programs. The Lahore School is mainly a commuter institute, with housing only available for females and faculty.

The values of Lahore School of Economics are said to be "excellence, integrity, social responsibility, humility, teamwork and egality".

History
The Lahore School of Economics was founded in 1993 by Dr. Shahid Amjad Chaudhry, a McGill University alumni and economist who served as the Deputy Chairman of the Planning Commission from July 2000 to July 2003 and Advisor to the Prime Minister on Finance Revenue and Planning from April to June 2013.

The university was chartered by the Government in January of 1997, through the Lahore School of Economics Act (Provincial Assembly of the Punjab- Act II of 1997).

Campus

The Lahore School has two campuses; the 'Main Campus' and the 'City Campus'.

The City Campus is located in Gulberg 3, Lahore and serves as the admissions office for all degree programs offered at Lahore School of Economics.

Academics
The Lahore School provides 10 undergraduate majors and 26 pre-defined double-major and minor combinations with concentrations in Economics, Finance, Accounting, Business Administration, Political Science, Mathematics, Statistics, Environmental Sciences, English and Media Studies. 

The graduate schools offers 2 PhD programs and 6 masters programs in addition to an MBA and an Executive MBA.

Lahore School of Economics consists of two distinctive post-grad institutes; the Graduate Institute of Development Studies, which carries out research and training in international development, and the Centre for Research in Economics and Business, which have two biannual publications; the Lahore Journal of Economics as well as the Lahore Journal of Business. Another department in The Lahore School is the Innovation Technology Centre.

The Lahore School has an E-Library known as the Lahore School of Economics Repository, which collects, preserves and distributes digital material to students and faculty.

Lahore School of Economics consistently ranked in the top business schools in Pakistan since 2015 according to Higher Education Commission's Business Schools ranking.

Notable Alumni
 Ismat Beg (PhD, University of Bucharest), Mathematician, known for his work on multiple-criteria decision analysis, and fixed points
 Ehsan Riaz Fatyana, Pakistani politician
 Maiza Hameed, Pakistani politician

See also 
List of universities in Pakistan

References

External links 
Lahore School of Economics - Official Website
Lahore School of Economics - Faculty

 
Business schools in Pakistan
Educational institutions established in 1993
Universities and colleges in Lahore